Mount Zimmermann is a peak (2,325 m) standing  north of Ritscher Peak in the Gruber Mountains, central Queen Maud Land. Discovered by the Third German Antarctic Expedition (1938–1939), led by Capt. Alfred Ritscher, and named for the vice-president of the Deutsche Forschungsgemeinschaft (German Research Society).

Mountains of Queen Maud Land
Princess Astrid Coast